De Arbeiderspers is a Dutch publishing company, started as a socialist enterprise. The name means 'The Workers' Press'.

History 
The company was started in 1929 as a combination of the publishing firm N.V. Ontwikkeling and the Dutch Social Democratic Workers' Party newspaper Het Volk. Currently it is part of a larger media conglomerate, the Weekbladpersgroep, which also includes publishing companies De Bezige Bij and Querido.

, a well-read and well-spoken man, was hired specifically to "stir the pot," and one of his first acquisitions was Gerrit Komrij, at the time a young poet with formalist, not socialist, tendencies. Ros is also responsible, with then-director Johan Veeninga, for the Privé-domein series.  joined the company in 1972.

Until 1991, Sontrop was the managing director. Ronald Dietz succeeded him, and during his tenure the press lost some of its high-profile writers (Jeroen Brouwers, Kristien Hemmerechts, and others). Martin Ros resigned in 1997. When in 2000 Gerrit Komrij, one of the best-known Dutch writers, came under contract with De Bezige Bij, pressure on Dietz increased and he resigned his position. Rob Haans became interim director.

Privé-domein
One of the Arbeiderspers's most successful series is Privé-domein ("private domain"), containing memoirs and autobiographies. The series was inspired by a similar series of ego documents by Editions du Cap, called Domaine privé, whose title was borrowed as well. The first volumes (containing a memoir by Mary McCarthy and a volume of titillating diary entries by Paul Léautaud) were published in 1966, and in forty-five years almost three hundred books appeared in the series. The "golden years" of the series were the 1980s, when its editors were Martin Ros, Theo Sontrop, and Emile Brugman.

References

Sources
 Sjaak Hubregtse. "Uitgeverij De Arbeiderspers: van ontstaan tot en met ontzuiling" in Marnix Krop, Martin Ros, Saskia Stuiveling and Bart Tromp (eds.) Het zevende jaarboek voor het democratisch socialisme. Amsterdam: De Arbeiderspers / Wiardi Beckman Stichting, 1986, . pp. 132–67. Revised version in pdf

External links
 
 Alles over Privé-domein, website incl. reviews, catalog, and interviews.
 Collectie Glasdia's Arbeiderspers at the International Institute of Social History

1929 establishments in the Netherlands
Book publishing companies of the Netherlands
Mass media in Amsterdam